Sister to Judas is a 1932 American drama film directed by E. Mason Hopper and starring Claire Windsor, Holmes Herbert and John Harron.

Cast
 Claire Windsor as Anne Fane 
 Holmes Herbert as Bruce Rogers
 John Harron as Ronnie Ross
 Lee Moran as Percy Fane
 David Callis as Elmer Fane
 Wilfred Lucas as Mike O'Flanagan
 Stella Adams as Mrs. Fane
 Virginia True Boardman as Mrs. Helen Ross
 Dorothy Vernon as Tenement Resident in Hallway

References

Bibliography
 Michael R. Pitts. Poverty Row Studios, 1929–1940: An Illustrated History of 55 Independent Film Companies, with a Filmography for Each. McFarland & Company, 2005.

External links
 

1932 films
1932 drama films
American drama films
Films directed by E. Mason Hopper
American black-and-white films
Mayfair Pictures films
1930s English-language films
1930s American films